Marecos is a surname. Notable people with the surname include:
Elvis Marecos (born 1980), Paraguayan footballer
Héctor Marecos (born 1979), Paraguayan footballer
Juan Marecos (born 1969), Paraguayan footballer

See also
Mareco